Juan Manuel Polar (born 24 September 1983 in Lima is a racing driver from Peru. He has previously competed in the Indy Lights, Spanish Formula Three Championship and Formula Renault among other series.

Career
Polar started is autoracing career in 2000 in the Skip Barber Formula Dodge Southern Race Series. At Sebring International Raceway the Peruvian won his first ever autorace. He eventually ran ten races in the series winning four races and he ended on the podium eight times. The Peruvian driver eventually classified seventh in the championship. In 2001 Polar competed in the inaugural Formula Dodge National Championship. At Sebring Polar won his only race in the series. He beat Júlio Campos and A. J. Allmendinger. In 2001 the Peruvian racing driver also competed at the opening round of the 2001 Barber Dodge Pro Series season. At Sebring he qualified thirteenth but failed to finish after making contact.

For 2002 Polar moved into Formula Renault, firstly the Mexican championship and in 2003 the British championship. In the British championship his best result was an eleventh place at the season finale at Oulton Park. In the first four rounds of the 2004 British Formula Renault championship Polar raced for Mark Burdett Motorsport, the last two rounds of the championship he raced for Team AKA. At Donington Park the Peruvian driver finished eighth, which moved him up the championship standings landing him the 25th place.

In 2005 Polar moved up the racing ladder towards the Spanish Formula Three Championship. He was signed by IGI Tec-Auto but later transferred to ECA Racing. At ECA Racing Polar finished third during the season finale at Circuit de Barcelona-Catalunya. The following season Polar drove in the Copa-class of the Spanish Formula Three Championship. The Peruvian driver scored four class victories and was placed second in the championship, behind Germán Sánchez. In 2007 he was again placed second in the Copa class, this time behind Thor-Christian Ebbesvik.

For 2008 he returned to the United States of America to race in the Indy Lights. He was first signed by Brian Stewart Racing. At Kansas Speedway Polar was replaced by Wade Cunningham which left Polar without a ride for the remainder of the season. He rejoined the field at Sonoma Raceway with Guthrie Racing.

After the 2008 season Polar returned to his home country. He continues racing in his national TC2000 series.

Motorsports results

American Open-Wheel racing results
(key) (Races in bold indicate pole position, races in italics indicate fastest race lap)

Barber Dodge Pro Series

Indy Lights results

References

1983 births
Sportspeople from Lima
Euroformula Open Championship drivers
Barber Pro Series drivers
Indy Lights drivers
British Formula Renault 2.0 drivers
Living people
Peruvian racing drivers
CRS Racing drivers
Mark Burdett Motorsport drivers